The sixth and final season of the American teen drama television series Gossip Girl premiered on The CW on October 8 and concluded on December 17, 2012, consisting of 10 episodes. Based on the novel series of the same name by Cecily von Ziegesar, the series was developed for television by Josh Schwartz and Stephanie Savage. The CW officially renewed the series for a sixth season on May 11, 2012. The series finale was preceded by a special retrospective, including interviews with the cast and crew.

Plot
As the scandal and drama filled group of friends enter their 20s, major questions of the future emerge. Serena decides to start fresh by dating an older man, Steven, whose 17-year-old daughter is secretly dating Nate. Waiting to be together, Blair and Chuck try to succeed separately in their own careers. As The Spectator hits financial ruins, Nate considers a political career. Dan and Georgina strike an unlikely friend as she assists him with his new book. After five years of upheaval, Gossip Girl's identity is finally revealed.

Cast and characters

Main cast
 Blake Lively as Serena van der Woodsen
 Leighton Meester as Blair Waldorf
 Penn Badgley as Dan Humphrey
 Chace Crawford as Nate Archibald
 Ed Westwick as Chuck Bass
 Kaylee DeFer as Ivy Dickens
 Kelly Rutherford as Lily Humphrey
 Matthew Settle as Rufus Humphrey
 Kristen Bell as Gossip Girl (uncredited)

Recurring cast
 Sofia Black-D'Elia as Sage Spence
 Robert John Burke as Bart Bass
 Barry Watson as Steven Spence
 Michelle Trachtenberg as Georgina Sparks
 Yin Chang as Nelly Yuki
 Tamara Feldman as Poppy Lifton
 Zuzanna Szadkowski as Dorota Kishlovsky
 Alice Callahan as Jessica Leitenberg
 Nan Zhang as Kati Farkas
 Margaret Colin as Eleanor Waldorf
 William Baldwin as William van der Woodsen
 Sam Robards as Howard Archibald
 Desmond Harrington as Jack Bass
 Wallace Shawn as Cyrus Rose

Special guest cast
 Connor Paolo as Eric van der Woodsen
 Taylor Momsen as Jenny Humphrey
 Alexa Chung as herself (Model for Blair's show)
 Michael Bloomberg as himself
 Lisa Loeb as herself
 Ella Rae Peck as Lola Rhodes (uncredited)
 Jessica Szohr as Vanessa Abrams (uncredited)
 Katie Cassidy as Juliet Sharp (uncredited)
 Willa Holland as Agnes Andrews (uncredited)
 Rachel Bilson as herself (uncredited)

Episodes

Production
On May 11, 2012, the series was picked up for a short sixth and final season, beginning in October and concluding on December 17. On May 17, 2012, with the reveal of The CW's 2012–13 television schedule, Gossip Girl stayed on Monday night and moved to the 9:00 pm Eastern/8:00 pm Central timeslot following the fifth season of 90210. It was announced on July 30, 2012, that the sixth season would have 10 episodes.

On April 25, 2012, it was confirmed that former showrunner and executive producer Joshua Safran left the show as he had become the new showrunner of NBC's Smash. On May 11, 2012, writer Sara Goodman was promoted to executive producer.

On October 29, the fourth episode of the season, "Portrait of a Lady Alexander", was rescheduled for November 5, due to Hurricane Sandy.

Cast
Blake Lively, Leighton Meester, Penn Badgley, Chace Crawford, Ed Westwick, Kaylee DeFer, Kelly Rutherford, and Matthew Settle all returned as series regulars. Michelle Trachtenberg was upgraded to a guest-starring role for this season. Former recurring stars Desmond Harrington and Robert John Burke also returned as guest stars for the season.

On July 7, 2012, actress Andrea Gabriel, known for her role on Lost, had been cast as a businesswoman from Dubai. 7th Heaven alum Barry Watson landed a guest-starring role as young entrepreneur Steven Spence, who becomes romantically involved with Serena.

British model Alexa Chung appears as herself in a plot involving Blair's new fashion line. Former Skins star Sofia Black-D'Elia was seen filming scenes with Lively for the then-upcoming sixth season. She played the role of Sage Spence, Steven's daughter.

Former Gossip Girl guest stars Tamara Feldman and Yin Chang were reported to return to the show for its final season as Poppy Lifton and Nelly Yuki, respectively. Taylor Momsen and Connor Paolo reprised their roles as Jenny Humphrey and Eric van der Woodsen for the series finale, who had not been seen since their departures in season 4. 

Kristen Bell, Rachel Bilson, Katie Cassidy, Ella Rae Peck, Willa Holland, Lisa Loeb, Michael Bloomberg and Jessica Szohr had cameo roles in the series finale.

Ratings

References

External links
 List of Gossip Girl season 6 episodes on IMDb

2012 American television seasons